Hestdalshøgdi is a mountain in Skjåk Municipality in Innlandet county, Norway. The mountain is surrounded by several other notable mountains including Grjothøi, Tverrfjellet, and Gjuvkampen to the northeast; Moldulhøi, Sandgrovhøi, and Hesthøi to the east; Hestbrepiggene and Låven to the south; and Gjelhøi to the southwest.

See also
List of mountains of Norway

References

Skjåk
Mountains of Innlandet